Escott may refer to:

Places
 Escott, Somerset, England, a hamlet in Stogumber parish
 Escott Station, Queensland, Australia

People with the surname
 Beryl E. Escott, Canadian writer about the British WAAF
 Harry Escott (b. 1976), English composer
 James Escott (1872–1916), New Zealand MP
 Thomas Hay Sweet Escott. (1844–1924) English journalist

People with the given name
 Escott Loney (1903–1982), English cricketer
 Escott Reid (1905–1999) Canadian diplomat
 Herbert Escott Inman, (1860–1915) British children's author

See also
 Sweet-Escott, a surname
 Prouhet–Tarry–Escott problem in mathematics
 Escot (disambiguation)